The International Federation of Intellectual Property Attorneys (formerly known as the International Federation of Industrial Property Attorneys), is a non-political, international, professional body of intellectual property professionals, i.e., patent attorneys and trademark attorneys, in private practice (as opposed to intellectual property professionals working in the industry). FICPI was established on September 1, 1906 and is based in Basel, Switzerland.

Dr. Roberto Pistolesi, a patent attorney, is the current president of FICPI.

See also 
 Intellectual property organization

References

External links 
 

Intellectual property organizations
Organizations established in 1906
1906 establishments in Switzerland